Olaf Heukrodt (born 23 January 1962 in Magdeburg) is an East German-German canoer who from the late 1970s to the early 1990s.

Competing in three Summer Olympics, Heukrodt won five medals with one gold (C-1 500 m: 1988), two silvers (C-2 1000 m: 1980, C-2 1000 m: 1988), and two bronzes (C-1 500 m: 1980, 1992).

Heukrodt also won 13 medals at the ICF Canoe Sprint World Championships with seven golds (C-1 500 m: 1981, 1982, 1985, 1986, 1987; C-1 1000 m: 1987, C-2 1000 m: 1985), four silvers (C-1 500 m: 1989, C-2 1000 m: 1981, 1983; C-4 1000 m: 1991), and two bronzes (C-1 500 m: 1991, C-2 1000 m: 1982). In October 1986, he was awarded a Star of People's Friendship in gold (second class) for his sporting success.

Heukrodt was married to swimmer Birgit Meineke.

References

Other sources

Wallechinsky, David and Jaime Loucky (2008). "Canoeing: Men's Canadian Singles 500 Meters". In The Complete Book of the Olympics: 2008 Edition. London: Aurum Press Limited. p. 479.

External links

1962 births
Living people
Sportspeople from Magdeburg
East German male canoeists
German male canoeists
Olympic canoeists of East Germany
Olympic canoeists of Germany
Canoeists at the 1980 Summer Olympics
Canoeists at the 1988 Summer Olympics
Canoeists at the 1992 Summer Olympics
Medalists at the 1980 Summer Olympics
Medalists at the 1988 Summer Olympics
Medalists at the 1992 Summer Olympics
Olympic gold medalists for East Germany
Olympic silver medalists for East Germany
Olympic bronze medalists for East Germany
Olympic bronze medalists for Germany
Olympic medalists in canoeing
ICF Canoe Sprint World Championships medalists in Canadian